Mir Sayyid Ali Hamadani (CE) was a Persian scholar, poet and a Sufi Muslim saint of the Kubrawiya order. He was born in Hamadan, Iran and preached Islam in Central Asia and Kashmir as he travelled to practice Sufism. He died in Kashmir and was buried in Khatlan, Tajikistan in 1384 CE, aged 71–72. Hamadani was also addressed honorifically throughout his life as the Shāh-e-Hamadān ("King of Hamadan"), Amīr-i Kabīr ("the Great Commander"), and Ali Sani ("second Ali").

Early life
The title "Sayyid" indicates that he was a descendant of the Islamic prophet Muhammad, possibly from both sides of his family.

Hamadani spent his early years under the tutelage of Ala ud-Daula Simnani, a famous Kubrawiya saint from Semnan, Iran. Despite his teacher's opposition to Ibn Arabi's explication of the wahdat al-wujud ("unity of existence"), Hamadani wrote Risala-i-Wujudiyya, a tract in defense of that doctrine, as well as two commentaries on Fusus al-Hikam, Ibn Arabi's work on Al-Insān al-Kāmil. Hamadani is credited with introducing the philosophy of Ibn-Arabi to South Asia.

Travels
Sayyid Ali Hamadani traveled widely and preached Islam in different parts of the world such as Afghanistan, Uzbekistan, China, Syria, Kashmir and Turkestan. 

The third visit of Sayyid 'Ali was caused by the third invasion of Persia by Timur in 1383 when he conquered 'Iraq, and decided to exterminate the 'Alavi Sayyids of Hamadan who, until his time, had played an important part in local affairs. Sayyid 'Ali, therefore, left Hamadan with 700 Sayyids, and set out towards Kashmir where he expected to be safe from the wrath of Timur. He had already sent two of his followers: Syed Taj ud-din Semnani and Mir Syed Hasan Semnani, to take stock of the situation. Shibu'd-din became a follower of Mir Syed Hasan Semnani and so Hamadani was welcomed in Kashmir by the king and his heir apparent Qutub ud-Din. At that time, the Kashmiri ruler was at war with Firuz Shah Tughlaq, the Sultan of Delhi, but Hamdani brokered a peace. Hamdani stayed in Kashmir for six months. After Sharaf-ud-Din Abdul Rehman Bulbul Shah, he was the second important Muslim to visit Kashmir. Hamadani went to Mecca, and then returned to Kashmir in 1379/80 CE, during the reign of Qutub ud-Din, and spent a year spreading Islam in Kashmir, before returning to Turkestan via Ladakh in 1381/82 CE. He returned to Kashmir for the third time in 1383/84 CE with the intention of staying for a longer period but had to return earlier owing to illness.
Hamadani died on his way back to Central Asia at a site close to the present day town of Mansehra in North-West Pakistan. His body was carried by his disciples to Kulab, Tajikistan, where his shrine is located.

Influence 
Hamadani started organised efforts to convert Kashmir to Islam. Hamadani is regarded as having brought various crafts and industries from Iran into Kashmir; it is said that he brought 700 Syed's with him to the country. The growth of the textile industry in Kashmir increased its demand for fine wool, which in turn meant that Kashmiri Muslim groups settled in Ladakh, bringing with them crafts such as minting and writing.

Hamadani wrote a book on politics, governance and social behaviour, called the Zakhirat ul-Muluk

Works
One manuscript (Raza Library, Rampur, 764; copied 929/1523) contains eleven works ascribed to Hamadani (whose silsila runs to Naw'i Khabushani; the manuscript contains two documents associated with him).
 Risalah Nooriyah is a tract on contemplation
 Risalah Maktubaat is a collection of Hamadani's letters
 Dur Mu’rifati Surat wa Sirat-i-Insaan, discusses the bodily and moral features of man
 Dur Haqaa’iki Tawbah, deals with the nature of penitence
 Hallil Nususi allal Fusus, is a commentary on Ibn Arabi’s Fusus-ul-Hikam
 Sharhi Qasidah Khamriyah Fariziyah, is a commentary on the wine qasidah of Umar ibn ul-Fariz who died in 786 A.H. =1385 A.C.
 Risalatul Istalahaat, is a treatise on Sufic terms and expressions
 ilmul Qiyafah or Risalah-i qiyafah is an essay on physiognomy. A copy of this exists in the United States National Library of Medicine.
 Dah Qa’idah gives ten rules of contemplative life
 Kitabul Mawdah Fil Qurba gathers traditions on affection among relatives
 Kitabus Sab’ina Fi Fadha’il Amiril Mu’minin, gives the seventy virtues of Ali.
 Arba’ina Amiriyah is forty traditions on man’s future life
 Rawdhtul Firdaws is an extract of a larger work entitled Manazilus Saaliqin, which is on Sufi-ism
 Awraad-ul-Fatehah gives a conception of the unity of God and His attributes
 Chehl Asraar (Forty Secrets), is a collection of forty poems in praise of Allah and Muhammad
 Zakhirat-ul-Muluk a treatise on political ethics and the rules of good government 
Syed Abdur-Rehman Hamdani in his book Salar-e-Ajjam lists 68 books and 23 pamphlets by Sayyid Ali Hamadani.

References

Bibliography
 John Renard 2005: Historical Dictionary of Sufism (Historical Dictionaries of Religions, Philosophies and Movements, 58), 

History of Kashmir
Persian philosophy
Iranian Sufis
Shafi'i
Iranian Shia scholars of Islam
14th-century Muslim scholars of Islam
1314 births
1384 deaths
Iranian Muslim mystics